Dark Sunday (French: Sombre dimanche) is a 1948 French drama film directed by Jacqueline Audry and starring Michèle Alfa, Paul Bernard and Marcelle Derrien. The film takes its name from the French title of the song "Gloomy Sunday".

The film's sets were designed by the art director Raymond Druart.

Synopsis
In pre-war France, a Hungarian immigrant musician is left so saddened when he is rejected by the woman he loves that he writes an incredibly gloomy piece of music. A music publisher is impressed with it and decides to promote using a marketing gimmick. He will get a woman to pretend to attempt suicide because she is so moved by the song.

Cast
 Michèle Alfa as Michèle
 Paul Bernard as Bob
 Jacques Dacqmine as Jan Laszlo
 Marcel Dalio as Max - l'éditeur
 Marcelle Derrien as Maria
 Colette Mars as Colette - une chanteurse
 Charles Lemontier as Le commissaire de police
 Edmond Ardisson as Le portier
 Alfred Baillou as Toni
 Jean Debray as Un journaliste
 Jean-Jacques Dreux as Roger
 Annette Lajon as Une chanteuse
 Palmyre Levasseur as La logeuse
 Julien Maffre as Un policier
 Renaud Mary as César
 Gilbert Moreau as Un photographe
 Georges Paulais as Le directeur
 Michel Seldow as Le brocanteur
 Sylvain as Un chanteur
 Roger Vincent as Un monsieur
 André Pasdoc as Un chanteur

References

Bibliography 
 Bessy, Maurice & Chirat, Raymond. ''Histoire du cinéma français: encyclopédie des films, 1940–1950. Pygmalion, 1986

External links 
 

1948 films
1948 drama films
French drama films
1940s French-language films
Films directed by Jacqueline Audry
Films set in the 1930s
1940s French films

de:Einsamer Sonntag
fr:Sombre Dimanche (film)